Morphosphaera sumatrana is a species of skeletonizing leaf beetle in the family Chrysomelidae, found in Malaysia and Indonesia.

References

External links

 

Galerucinae
Beetles of Asia
Beetles described in 1886
Taxa named by Martin Jacoby